A microlife is a unit of risk representing half an hour change of life expectancy.

Discussed by David Spiegelhalter and Alejandro Leiva, and also used by Lin et al. for decision analysis, microlives are intended as a simple way of communicating the impact of a lifestyle or environmental risk factor, based on the associated daily proportional effect on expected length of life. Similar to the micromort (one in a million probability of death) the microlife is intended for "rough but fair comparisons between the sizes of chronic risks". This is to avoid the biasing effects of describing risks in relative hazard ratios, converting them into somewhat tangible units. Similarly they bring long-term future risks into the here-and-now as a gain or loss of time. 

"A daily loss or gain of 30 minutes can be termed a microlife, because 1 000 000 half hours (57 years) roughly corresponds to a lifetime of adult exposure."

The microlife exploits the fact that for small hazard ratios the change in life expectancy is roughly linear. They are by necessity rough estimates, based on averages over population and lifetime. Effects of individual variability, short-term or changing habits, and causal factors are not taken into account. 

{| class="wikitable"
|+ Microlives gained/lost per day of exposure, based on estimated life expectancy effects of long term lifestyle and demographic risk factors, for men and women aged 35 years.
!Risk factor	||	Men	||	Women	
|-
|colspan="3"|Smoking
|-
|style="padding-left:1em;"|Smoking 15–24 cigarettes	||	−10	||	−9
|-
|colspan="3"|Alcohol intake
|-
|style="padding-left:1em;"|First drink (of 10 g alcohol)	||	1	||	1
|-
|style="padding-left:1em;"|Each subsequent drink (up to 6)	||	−½	||	−1
|-
|colspan="3"|Obesity
|-
|style="padding-left:1em;"|Per 5 units above body mass index of 22.5 each day	||	−3	||	−3
|-
|style="padding-left:1em;"|Per 5 kg above optimum weight for average height each day	||	−1	||	−1
|-
|colspan="3"|Sedentary behaviour
|-
|style="padding-left:1em;"|2 hours watching television	||	−1	||	−1
|-
|colspan="3"|Diet
|-
|style="padding-left:1em;"|Red meat, 1 portion (85 g, 3 oz)	||	−1	||	−1
|-
|style="padding-left:1em;"|Fruit and vegetable intake, =5 servings (blood vitamin C >50 nmol/L)	||	4	||	3
|-
|colspan="3"|Coffee intake
|-
|style="padding-left:1em;"|2-3 cups	||	1	||	1
|-
|colspan="3"|Physical activity
|-
|style="padding-left:1em;"|First 20 minutes of moderate exercise	||	2	||	2
|-
|style="padding-left:1em;"|Subsequent 40 minutes of moderate exercise	||	1	||	½
|-
|colspan="3"|Statins
|-
|style="padding-left:1em;"|Taking a statin	||	1	||	1
|-
|colspan="3"|Air pollution
|-
|style="padding-left:1em;"|Per day living in Mexico City v London	||	−½	||	−½
|-
|colspan="3"|Geography
|-
|style="padding-left:1em;"|Per day being a resident of Russia v Sweden	||	−21	||	−9
|-
|colspan="3"|Era
|-
|style="padding-left:1em;"|Per day living in 2010 v 1910	||	15	||	15
|-
|style="padding-left:1em;"|Per day living in 2010 v 1980	||	8	||	5
|}

See also 
 Micromort
 Risk communication

References

Further reading 

 A calculator for about eight different factors' effect upon microlives.
Health risk